A list of films produced by the Marathi language film industry based in Maharashtra in the year 1932.

1932 Releases
A list of Marathi films released in 1932.

References

External links
Gomolo - 

Lists of 1932 films by country or language
1932
1932 in Indian cinema